Russula galbana is a fungus in the family, Russulaceae, found in leaf litter in open forests of Allocasuarina littoralis and Eucalyptus tereticornis in Queensland.

It was first described in 2007 by Teresa Lebel and Jennifer Tonkin.

References

galbana
Taxa named by Teresa Lebel